Scotts Peak is a mountain in South West Tasmania  which is associated with the construction and flooding of the original Lake Pedder, as the lake now completely surrounds the peak. It lies east of the Frankland Range and has an elevation of 669 metres.

There is a Scotts Peak Dam and a Scotts Peak Dam Road in the region.

Scotts Peak is accessible by Scotts Peak Dam Road and the Lake Pedder boat ramp. Many people kayak across the reservoir to hike Scotts Peak.

Climate

Further reading
(1990) Draft recreation development plan : Strathgordon - Scotts Peak area. Hobart, Tas. : Department of Parks, Wildlife and Heritage.

References

Mountains of Tasmania
Lake Pedder